Malinawka (also referred to as Malinaŭka or Malinovka) is a Minsk Metro station. It was opened on June 3, 2014. Architectural elements of the station were enhanced by the work of sculptor Maxim Piatrul

Gallery

References

Minsk Metro stations
Railway stations opened in 2014
2014 establishments in Belarus